The Blue Nile Falls is a waterfall on the Blue Nile river in Ethiopia. It is known as Tis Abay in Amharic, meaning "Smoke Abay". The falls are one of Ethiopia's best-known tourist attractions.

The falls are  high, consisting of four streams that originally varied from a trickle in the dry season to over 400 meters wide in the rainy season. Regulation of Lake Tana now reduces the variation somewhat, and since 2003 a hydro-electric station has taken much of the flow out of the falls except during the rainy season. The Blue Nile Falls isolate the ecology of Lake Tana from the ecology of the rest of the Nile, and this isolation has played a role in the evolution of the endemic fauna of the lake. 

A short distance downstream from the falls sits the first stone bridge constructed in Ethiopia, built at the command of Emperor Susenyos in 1626. According to Manuel de Almeida, stone for making lime had been found nearby along the tributary Alata, and a craftsman who had come from India with Afonso Mendes, the Catholic Patriarch of Ethiopia, supervised the construction.

Notes

Waterfalls of Ethiopia
Blue Nile
Tourist attractions in Ethiopia
Block waterfalls

Blue Nile Falls /"Tis Abay  Falls"/ are found in West Gojjam, Amhara Region, Ethiopia.